Prospect, an electoral district of the Legislative Assembly in the Australian state of New South Wales, was created in 2015, largely replacing Smithfield.


Members for Prospect

Election results

Elections in the 2010s

2019

2015

References

New South Wales state electoral results by district